Frog Station is an unincorporated community in the towns of Red River and Luxemburg, in Kewaunee County, Wisconsin, United States.

Notes

Unincorporated communities in Wisconsin
Unincorporated communities in Kewaunee County, Wisconsin